During the 1991–92 English football season, Watford F.C. competed in the Football League Second Division.

Season summary
In the 1991–92 season, Watford had a poor first half of the campaign and by Christmas were only above the relegation places on goal difference with their home form dragging them down the league with 7 defeats from the first 12 league matches at home. By the middle of March, the Hornets were still near the relegation zone and at that point one of the big contenders by many to go down but an amazing run of one defeat from their final 13 league games which included 8 wins, secured safety and finished in a satisfying 10th place.

Final league table

Results
Watford's score comes first

Legend

Football League Second Division

FA Cup

League Cup

Full Members Cup

Squad

References

Watford F.C. seasons
Watford